XEHL-FM is a radio station on 102.7 FM in Guadalajara, Jalisco, Mexico. The station is owned by Radiópolis and carries the Los 40 format.

History
XEHL-FM received its first concession on April 2, 1969. It was the sister FM to XEHL-AM 1010.

On November 8, 2017, the IFT authorized the relocation of XEHL-FM to Cerro del Cuatro.

References

Radio stations in Guadalajara
Radio stations established in 1969
Radiópolis